Zach's Zoomer is a wooden roller coaster at Michigan's Adventure in Muskegon, Michigan. Zach's Zoomer was manufactured by Custom Coasters International. It opened in 1994 and is targeted toward younger audiences. Zach's Zoomer was named after Roger Jourden's grandson and current General Manager Camille Jourden-Mark's son, Zach Mark.

The roller coaster is a family coaster and is designed to be the first step to the larger coasters. It doesn't have sudden drops or high speeds. It is one of three wooden roller coasters in the park and is an ACE Coaster Classic.

The layout is the same as the old John Allen-designed kiddie wooden coasters like Woodstock Express at sister parks Kings Island, Kings Dominion, and Carowinds.

Incidents
On June 30, 2000, a 38-year-old woman fell out of the ride and suffered critical injuries as she turned to take pictures of her relatives in the cars behind her.

References

External links

Official page

Roller coasters in Michigan
Roller coasters introduced in 1994
Michigan's Adventure
Roller coasters operated by Cedar Fair